Cheshnegirovo Air Base/Sadovo (ICAO code: LBPS) used to house the 25th Fighter-Bomber Air Regiment (flying MiG-23BN/UBs) of the 10th Composite Aviation Corps. Located in central Bulgaria, north east of Plovdiv. According to the major restructuring plans it became the first regiment to convert to an air base structure. Briefly it housed the entire Bulgarian MiG-23 fleet after which it became inactive.

History 
Alternate name Sadovo. Also spelled 'Tcheshnigirovo'. Date when built  - 1951. Home of 25 Fighter-Bomber Air Regiment of 10th Composite Air Corps, with the Mikoyan-Gurevich MiG-17 "Fresco". In 1976 it received the MiG-23BN. The base closed in 2000 and is now used for the storage of aircraft. There are reports that the 68 Special Forces Brigade will move here from Plovdiv.

Runway data: Location: N42 06 50.91 E024 59 34.59, Elev: 604 ft (184 m), Rwy 10/28, Size: 8345 x 170 ft (2544 x 52 m), concrete.

Aircraft

References:
European Air Forces Directory 2003/04 (Mach III)
European Air Forces Directory 2005/06 (Mach III)

Mikoyan-Gurevich MiG-23UB Flogger

References:

European Air Forces Directory 2003/04 (Mach III)
European Air Forces Directory 2005/06 (Mach III)
arrow-aviation.nl

See also
Dobroslavtsi Air Base
Gabrovnitsa Air Base
Uzundzhovo Air Base
Graf Ignatievo Air Base
Bezmer Air Base
Dobrich Air Base
Ravnets Air Base
Balchik Air Base
Vrazhdebna Air Base
List of Bulgarian Air Force bases
List of Bulgarian military bases
28th Air Detachment
Military of Bulgaria
The Bulgarian Cosmonauts
List of joint US-Bulgarian military bases

References

 
Снимки на авиобазата след нейното затваряне.
 www.aeroflight.co.uk

Bibliography
Air Base History 
Air Group 2000 

Bulgarian Air Force
Military airbases
Airports in Bulgaria
Military installations of Bulgaria